The Italian Long Distance Mountain Running Championships are the national championships in long-distance mountain running, organised every year by the FIDAL from 2010.

The first edition of these Italian championships, the heirs of the Italian Championship of Gran Fondo, took place in 2008 in Trentino, while the 2009 edition, initially scheduled in September in Abruzzo, was not played. Since 2010, the competition has taken place regularly

Description
Usually the national championship dispute, in the same venue, in two different distances for men and women.

Editions and winners

See also
 World Long Distance Mountain Running Championships
 Italian Mountain Running Championships

References

External links
FIDAL web site

Mountain running competitions
Mountain Long
Athletics competitions in Italy
National athletics competitions
Recurring sporting events established in 2008